Kolnyang is a  boma in  Kolnyang payam, Bor South County, Jonglei State, South Sudan.

Demographics
According to the Fifth Population and Housing Census of Sudan, conducted in April 2008, Kolnyang  boma had a population of 7,558 people, composed of 4,046 male and 3,512 female residents.

Notes

References 

Populated places in Jonglei State